Entomobirnavirus is a genus of viruses in the family Birnaviridae. Its natural host is the fly Drosophila melanogaster. There are two species in this genus.

Taxonomy
The genus contains the following species:
 Drosophila X virus
 Mosquito X virus

Structure
Viruses in the genus Entomobirnavirus are non-enveloped, with icosahedral and single-shelled geometries, and T=13 symmetry. The diameter is around 70 nm. Genomes are linear and segmented, around 15.3.2-3.5kb in length. The genome codes for 5 proteins.

Life cycle
Viral replication is cytoplasmic. Entry into the host cell is achieved by penetration into the host cell. Replication follows the double-stranded RNA virus replication model. Double-stranded rna virus transcription is the method of transcription. Drosophila melanogaster serve as the natural host.

References

External links
 ICTV Report: Birnaviridae
 Viralzone: Entomobirnavirus

Birnaviridae
Virus genera